USS New Hampshire was a 2,633-ton ship originally designed to be the 74-gun ship of the line Alabama, but she remained on the stocks for nearly 40 years, well into the age of steam, before being renamed and launched as a storeship and depot ship during the American Civil War. She was later renamed to USS Granite State.

Service history
As Alabama, she was one of "nine ships to rate not less than 74 guns each" authorized by Congress on 29 April 1816, and was laid down by the Portsmouth Naval Shipyard, Maine, in June 1819, the year the State of Alabama was admitted to the Union. Though ready for launch by 1825, she remained on the stocks for preservation; an economical measure that avoided the expense of manning and maintaining a ship of the line. Renamed New Hampshire on 28 October 1863, she was launched on 23 April 1864, fitted out as a storeship and depot ship of the South Atlantic Blockading Squadron, and commissioned on 13 May 1864, Commodore Henry K. Thatcher in command.

New Hampshire sailed from Portsmouth, New Hampshire on 15 June and relieved sister ship  on 29 July 1864 as store and depot ship at Port Royal, South Carolina, and served there through the end of the Civil War. She returned to Norfolk, Virginia on 8 June 1866, serving as a receiving ship there until 10 May 1876, when she sailed back to Port Royal. She resumed duty at Norfolk in 1881 but soon shifted to Newport, Rhode Island. She became flagship of Commodore Stephen B. Luce's newly formed Apprentice Training Squadron, marking the commencement of an effective apprentice training program for the Navy. Four of New Hampshires crewmen earned the Medal of Honor for jumping overboard to rescue fellow sailors from drowning in two separate 1882 incidents: Quartermaster Henry J. Manning and Ship's Printer John McCarton on 4 January 1882, and Boatswain's Mate James F. Sullivan and Chief Boatswain's Mate Jeremiah Troy on 21 April 1882.

New Hampshire was towed from Newport to New London, Connecticut in 1891 and was receiving ship there until decommissioned on 5 June 1892. The following year she was loaned as a training ship for the New York Naval Militia, which was to furnish nearly a thousand officers and men to the Navy during the Spanish–American War. New Hampshire was renamed Granite State on 30 November 1904 to free the name "New Hampshire" for a newly authorized battleship .  Stationed in the Hudson River, Granite State continued training service throughout the years leading to World War I when State naval militia were practically the only trained and equipped men available to the Navy for immediate service. They were mustered into the Navy as National Naval Volunteers. The Secretary of the Navy and a Newspaper writer Josephus Daniels wrote in his paper Our Navy at War, "never again will men dare ridicule the Volunteer, the Reservist, the man who in a national crisis lays aside civilian duty to become a soldier or sailor—they fought well. They died well. They have left in deeds and words a record that will be an inspiration to unborn generations."

Granite State served the New York State Militia until she caught fire and sank at her pier in the Hudson River on 23 May 1921. Her hull was sold for salvage on 19 August to the Mulholland Machinery Corporation. Refloated in July 1922, she was taken in tow headed for the Bay of Fundy. The towline parted during a storm, she again caught fire and sank off Half Way Rock near Manchester-by-the-Sea, Massachusetts on 26 July.

Although the hull is mostly buried in the sand, small artifacts and copper spikes may still be found. The site was added to the National Register of Historic Places on 29 October 1976, reference number 76000261.

See also

 National Register of Historic Places listings in Essex County, Massachusetts

Citations

References

External links

 New England Shipwrecks: USS New Hampshire
 Metrowest Dive Club info on New Hampshire

Ships of the line of the United States Navy
Ships built in Kittery, Maine
1864 ships
Ships of the Union Navy
Stores ships of the United States Navy
American Civil War auxiliary ships of the United States

Training ships of the United States Navy
World War I auxiliary ships of the United States
Shipwrecks of the Massachusetts coast
Spanish–American War auxiliary ships of the United States
Maritime incidents in 1921
Maritime incidents in 1922
Victorian-era ships of the line
National Register of Historic Places in Essex County, Massachusetts